Sleep tracking is the process of monitoring a person's sleep, most commonly through measuring inactivity and movement. A device that tracks a person's sleep is called a sleep tracker. Devices capable of tracking a person's sleep include dedicated sleep trackers, trackers that clip onto a person's pillow, smartphones, fitness trackers, smartwatches, and other wearable devices. 

Some sleep trackers are capable of tracking the stages of a person's sleep (light sleep, deep sleep, REM sleep), the length/duration of a person's sleep, the quality of a person's sleep, and the consistency of a person's sleep. Some sleep trackers offer other features, such as "sleep scores" that rank how well a person slept, "smart alarms" that wake a person up within a set period of time based on the circumstances of the person's sleep, and the ability to track the amount of light and/or the temperature in the person's bedroom.

As of 2017, it is estimated that 10% of adults in the United States use a wearable fitness and/or sleep tracking device on a regular basis.

Effectiveness 
Dr. Alan Schwartz, director of the Sleep Disorders Center at Johns Hopkins Bayview Medical Center, said that while sleep tracking devices can be useful for helping a person recognize patterns in their sleep habits, they are not capable of directly measuring a person's sleep unlike sleep study. Instead, according to Schwartz, "Most sleep tracking devices make some guesstimate as to how much you’re actually sleeping." and that the information the tracker provides to the person using it should be taken "with a grain of salt", but added that the tracker will still "give you something to reflect on".

Dr. W. Chris Winter, Men’s Health sleep adviser and author of The Sleep Solution: Why Your Sleep Is Broken and How to Fix It said that the data sleep tracking devices provide can be useful and that the trackers do a good job of providing insight into a person's sleep patterns over time, such as the total time a person's probably sleeping. However Winter also said that trackers can struggle with determining the stage of sleep a person is in. Dr. Isha Gupta, a neurologist at IGEA Brain & Spine said that sleep tracking devices offer a good way to gain an overall idea of how often a person wakes up at night, how long it takes a person to fall asleep, and data that can help a person tweak their habits, such as setting an earlier bedtime or keeping their bedroom cooler. However, according to Gupta, there's concern that trackers overestimate sleep when a person's body is still and the person's heart rate has slowed, but the person is not actually sleeping.

Raphael Vallat, a postdoctoral researcher at the Center for Human Sleep Science at the University of California, Berkeley, recommended that people don't check their sleep data through sleep tracking devices on a regular basis, saying that it "can modify the perception of your sleep” in that "You may think: 'Oh, gosh, I didn’t sleep well. Should I be tired? Am I in a bad mood?'"

In a study published in the Journal of Clinical Sleep Medicine on February 15, 2017, researchers from Rush University Medical College and Northwestern University’s Feinberg School of Medicine found that the three patients involved in the study using sleep tracking devices complained about the sleep data that was collected by applications and devices from Nike, Apple, Fitbit and other companies. The researchers also found that the patients involved spent excessive time in bed in order to increase their "sleep numbers", which may have actually made their insomnia worse. The researchers involved in the study warned that sleep tracking devices could provide inaccurate data and worsen insomnia in the person using the device by making them unhealthily obsessed with achieving perfect sleep, a condition the researchers called orthosomnia, which they coined in the study.

See also 
 Activity tracker

References 

Sleep
Health
Tracking